Křižanovice u Vyškova is a municipality and village in Vyškov District in the South Moravian Region of the Czech Republic. It has about 100 inhabitants.

References

Villages in Vyškov District